Abaz Hilmi (Abaz Hilmi Dede; 13 March 1887 – 18 March 1947) was the 5th Dedebaba (or Kryegjysh) of the Bektashi Order.

Biography

Early years
Abaz Hilmi was born and raised in Mërtinj village in the Përmet region. Around 1905, he became a dervish under Baba Shaban at the tekke of Baba Tahir in Prishta, Skrapar.

From World War I to World War II
He and Baba Shaban fled the tekke in January 1914, when Greece occupied Albanian tekkes and destroyed many of them. They lived in exile in Egypt for four years and were finally able to return to Albania in 1918. Back in Albania, he helped rebuild the tekkes at Prishta, Suka, and Frashër. Abaz Hilmi also attended the first, second and third National Congresses of the Bektashi in 1921, 1924 and 1929. He was also baba at the tekke of Frashër from 1942 to 1945, during World War II.

After World War II
However, Abaz Hilmi was not liked by the Communists during the years directly following World War II. Xhafer Sadik was set up by the Communists to preside over the Fourth National Congress of the Bektashi in May 1945, and Abaz Hilmi was appointed Dedebaba on 6 September 1945. Nonetheless, Abaz Hilmi would only hold that position until 19 March 1947 when he committed suicide. Baba Faja Martaneshi had pushed for liberal reforms such as allowing clerics to marry, shave their beards, and wear non-clerical clothing, reforms which Abaz Hilmi had opposed.

Murder–suicide
On 19 March 1947, Abaz Hilmi shot and killed both Baba Faja Martaneshi and Baba Fejzo Dervishi, and also killed himself afterwards. Ahmet Myftar was subsequently appointed as Dedebaba by the Communist regime on 8 June 1947.

Tyrbe
Today, the remains of Dede Baba Abaz Hilmi are buried in a tyrbe at the World Headquarters of the Bektashi in Tirana, Albania.

References

1887 births
1947 deaths 
Bektashi dedebabas
Albanian Sufis
Albanian religious leaders
Murder–suicides in Albania
People from Përmet
Suicides by firearm in Albania
1940s murders in Albania
1947 murders in Europe 
1947 crimes in Albania